Plurality may refer to:

Voting
 Plurality (voting), or relative majority, when a given candidate receives more votes than any other but still fewer than half of the total
 Plurality voting, system in which each voter votes for one candidate and the candidate with a plurality is elected
 Plurality-at-large voting or block voting, system for electing several representatives from a single electoral district

Psychology and psychiatry
 Multiplicity (psychology), also known as plurality, where multiple consciousnesses share one body
 Dissociative identity disorder, dissociative disorder associated with plurality
 Other specified dissociative disorder, psychiatric diagnosis associated with plurality

Other uses
 Plurality opinion, in a decision by a multi-member court, an opinion held by more judges than any other but not by an overall majority
 Plurality (church governance), a type of Christian church polity in which decisions are made by a committee
 Plurality (company), an Israeli semiconductor company
 Plurality, one of the "twelve pure concepts of the understanding" proposed by Kant in his Critique of Pure Reason
 Plurality, the holding of more than one benefice

See also
 Plural, a linguistic form commonly used to denote two or more of something
 The largest subgroup, but less than fifty percent of the total in majority
 Plurality of worlds (disambiguation)
 Pluralism (disambiguation)
 Pluralism (political theory), the view that political decisions be made mostly by government but also by non-governmental groups
 Plurality of gods, and understanding of God in Mormonism
 Ontological pluralism